Eilean Dubh (Scottish Gaelic, 'Black Island') may refer to:

 List of islands called Eilean Dubh
 Eilean Dubh (ferry)

See also
Black Island (disambiguation)
Black Isle (Scottish Gaelic: an t-Eilean Dubh)